Valadao or Valadão is a surname. Notable people with the surname include:

Ana Paula Valadão (born 1976), Brazilian singer
André Valadão (born 1978), Brazilian singer
Mariana Valadão (born 1984), Brazilian singer
Márcio Valadão (born 1947), Brazilian pastor
David Valadao (born 1977), American politician